Potamus Deiradiotes or Potamos Deiradiotes, was a deme of ancient Attica. It lay on the east coast north of Thoricus, and was once a populous place: it was celebrated as containing the sepulchre of Ion.

Potamus Deiradiotes is tentatively located north of Thorikos.

References

Populated places in ancient Attica
Former populated places in Greece
Demoi